William Cannon (1809–1865), was an American politician.

William Cannon (or variants) may also refer to:

Sports
Bill Cannon (footballer) (born 1956), Australian rules footballer for St Kilda
Billy Cannon (1937–2018), American football player
Billy Cannon Jr. (born 1961), his son, American football player
William Cannon (cricketer) (1871–1933), Australian cricketer
Willie Cannon (American football), American arena football player (see: Denver Dynamite (arena football))
William Cannon (dancer) from Dance Magazine's "25 to Watch"

TV and film
William Cannon (director) (1907–1990), American director
William Cannon (actor), American actor in Days of Darkness (2007 American film)
William Cannon (writer), TV show writer (Going Bananas)

Others
William Cannon (pioneer) (1755–1854), Oregon Country pioneer
William Ragsdale Cannon (1916–1997), American bishop
Will Cannon, Sr. and Will Cannon, Jr., architects, founders of CannonDesign

See also
Doran William Cannon (1937–2005), American screenwriter
James William Cannon (1852–1921), American industrialist, founded the Cannon Mills Corporation